Umatilla dace (Rhinichthys umatilla) is a species of ray-finned fish in the genus Rhinichthys. It is found in the drainage basin of the Columbia River in British Columbia, Washington state, Oregon and Idaho.

References 

Rhinichthys
Fish described in 1894